Cape Omega is a prominent rock cape between Omega Glacier and Daruma Rock on the coast of Queen Maud Land. Mapped from surveys and air photos by Japanese Antarctic Research Expedition (JARE), 1957–62, who gave the name.

Headlands of Queen Maud Land
Prince Olav Coast